GIP or Gip may refer to:

Businesses and organisations
 Gaumee Itthihaad, a political party in Maldives
 General Intelligence Presidency, the primary intelligence agency of Saudi Arabia
 Ghetto Informant Program, of the U.S. Federal Bureau of Investigation
 Georgia Innocence Project, an American non-profit corporation 
 Global Infrastructure Partners, an American private equity firm  
 Graduate Institute of Peace Studies, Kyung Hee University, South Korea
 Groupe d'Information sur les Prisons, a French organisation in the 1970s
 Global Initiative on Psychiatry
 Air Guinee Express, ICAO airline code GIP

Places
 Gip, West Virginia, U.S.
 The Great India Place, or GIP Mall, Noida, Uttar Pradesh, India
 Gipsy Hill railway station, London, England, National Rail station code GIP

Science and technology
 Gastric inhibitory polypeptide
 Graph isomorphism problem
 GSM Interworking Profile, a telecommunications standard

Other uses
 Francisco João "GIP" da Costa (1859–1900), a Goan journalist
 Gibraltar pound by ISO 4217 currency code
 Green industrial policy
 Government investment pool

See also

 Gib (disambiguation)
 Gips (disambiguation)
 Gipper (disambiguation)
 Gipp, a surname